SATel is a Bangladeshi fixed line regional operator. It is a private public switched telephone network (PSTN) operator in the South-East region of Bangladesh. As of November 2009, total number of subscriber of this operator is 17.577 thousand.

References

Telecommunications companies of Bangladesh